The University of Science and Technology of Southern Philippines (USTP) is a state university system in the Philippines established on August 16, 2016, by virtue of Republic Act 10919 through the amalgamation of the Mindanao University of Science and Technology (MUST) in Cagayan de Oro and the Misamis Oriental State College of Agriculture and Technology (MOSCAT) in Claveria, Misamis Oriental. Both campuses are located in Northern Mindanao, considered the Gateway to Mindanao, which offers a strategic locational advantage for the institution to train and develop students from all the other regions of Mindanao.

It has maintained its Level IV Status as State University (Highest Distinction) as adjudged by the Commission on Higher Education (CHED) and the Department of Budget and Management (DBM) and continues to be one of the 19 leading state universities in the Philippines.

The university has a  major campus in Cagayan de Oro. Its other major campus in Claveria has  of rich agricultural land. USTP's main campus is at the institution's  property in Alubijid, Misamis Oriental. The university also has satellite campuses in Jasaan, Villanueva, and Balubal (Cagayan de Oro), all in Misamis Oriental, and in Panaon and Oroquieta in Misamis Occidental.

History

Mindanao University of Science and Technology (MUST) has achieved its university status on 7 January 2009 after a long journey from its humble beginnings as a tradeschool in 1927.

The seed of MUST gained roots through the Pre-Commonwealth Act No. 3377 known as the Vocational Act of 1927. It was named as the Misamis Oriental Trade School (MOTS) which catered to the elementary level only but eventually in 1936, it opened a secondary four-year program.

In accordance to Republic Act No. 672 of 1952, MOTS became Mindanao School of Arts and Trades (MSAT) offering trade technical curriculum. Later in 1970, the school was authorized by virtue of RA 3959 to offer Bachelor of Science in Industrial Education and the Evening Opportunity Programs. In 1978, Presidential Decree 1431 upgraded the institution to Don Mariano Marcos Memorial Polytechnic State College. In 1991, it was renamed Mindanao Polytechnic State College (MPSC) and it also gained a new function – provide extension services.

The proposal to convert MPSC to MUST was presented in 1998, to the constituents of the institution and the general public. But the bill failed to prosper due to the moratorium on the creation of SUCs in the country (1998), Senate adjournment (2003); and the bill named HB 4914 was filed during the 13th Congress but was not finalized.

In 2006, Cong. Rufus Rodriguez filed House Bill 4914. On October 3, 2008, the historic Senate Public Hearing happened at the university gymnasium with Sen. Miguel Zubiri as the presiding officer. Eventually, the Senate and Congress approved the bill in December 2008.

On January 7, 2009, Republic Act No. 9519 was signed by President Gloria Macapagal-Arroyo at the MUST Gymnasium. The occasion was graced by senators, congressmen, local officials, civic organizations, GOs, private sectors, higher education institutions and stakeholders.

Milestones and timeline
 1927 – Pre-Commonwealth Act No. 3377 known as the Vocational Act of 1927 established Misamis Oriental Trade School (MOTS) operating at the elementary level. In 1936, the intermediate program was replaced with the four-year secondary trade program.
 1952 – Republic Act No. 672 converted MOTS into the Mindanao School of Arts and Trades (MSAT) offering two-year trade technical education. In 1970, Republic Act of 3959 authorized the offering of Bachelor of Science in Industrial Education and the Evening Opportunity Programs.
 1978 – Presidential Decree 1431 converted MSAT to Don Mariano Marcos Memorial Polytechnic State College (DMMMPSC) with the mission "to provide quality relevant and trained human resources and to promote research supportive to the industrialization of Northern Mindanao."
 1991 – Republic Act No. 7102 renamed DMMMPSC to Mindanao Polytechnic State College (MPSC) with the addition of the third function of the college — extension services — in the original mission.
 1995 – Proposal for Mindanao University of Science and Technology was presented to the faculty and staff, students, PTA officials, and the general public. In 2002, Congressman John Michael C. Luzon of the Lone District of Cagayan de Oro filed House Bill No. 4582 for the conversion of MUST. The House Sub-Committee on Higher Education approved the bill in 2003.
 2009 – Republic Act No. 9519 converted Mindanao Polytechnic State College (MPSC) into a university. MPSC will now be known as Mindanao University of Science and Technology (MUST).
 In February 2011, during the MUST days, Rufus Rodriguez said that a bill will be drafted to transform MUST into University of Science and Technology in the Philippines (USTP).
 On July 21, 2016, Republic Act No. 10919 established the University of Science and Technology of Southern Philippines (USTSP) that amalgamated the Mindanao University of Science and Technology (MUST) and Misamis Oriental State College of Agriculture and Technology (MOSCAT) transferring its main campus to the 292 hectares in Alubijid, Misamis Oriental.

Accreditation

Accreditation of academic programs have been conducted by the Accrediting Agency of Chartered Colleges and Universities in the Philippines (AACCUP). Some programs reach as high as level III. The competent accreditation status provided MUST with COE and COD grants from CHED.

Accreditation of academic programs have been conducted by the Accrediting Agency of Chartered Colleges and Universities in the Philippines (AACCUP). Some programs reach level II accreditation.

See also
 MASCUF
 Mindanao Polytechnic State College
 Misamis Oriental State College of Agriculture and Technology
 Northern Mindanao

References

External links
 Claveria Campus website
 Cagayan de Oro Campus website
 

Universities and colleges in Cagayan de Oro
State universities and colleges in the Philippines
Mindanao Association State Colleges and Universities Foundation
Philippine Association of State Universities and Colleges